John Ashley Cockett (23 December 1927 – 15 February 2020) was an English sportsman who was an Olympic bronze medal-winning field hockey player for England and Great Britain. He also played first-class and minor counties cricket.

Cockett was born in Broadstairs. He attended Cambridge University and won his Blues at both cricket and hockey. As a cricketer he was a middle-order batsman while his hockey was played as a half-back. He made seven first-class appearances for Cambridge University in 1951 and made a century against Sussex in Worthing to help set up a 137 run win. From 1949 to 1962, Cockett regularly played in the Minor Counties Cricket Championship for Buckinghamshire. On leaving Cambridge Cockett became a master at Felsted School, where he taught mathematics and coached cricket and hockey.

At the 1952 Summer Olympics in Helsinki, Cockett was a member of the Great Britain hockey team, which won the bronze medal by defeating Pakistan 2–1. He played his club hockey with Chelmsford Hockey Club. He narrowly missed out on another medal in the 1956 Melbourne Olympics when his side finished fourth after losing 3–1 to Germany.

Cockett's only other first-class match was in 1953, when he played with the Minor Counties cricket team against the touring Australians which included Alan Davidson, Ray Lindwall, Bill Johnston and Richie Benaud. Cockett scored no runs in either innings.

References

External links
 

1927 births
2020 deaths
English cricketers
Cambridge University cricketers
Minor Counties cricketers
Buckinghamshire cricketers
English male field hockey players
Olympic field hockey players of Great Britain
British male field hockey players
Field hockey players at the 1952 Summer Olympics
Field hockey players at the 1956 Summer Olympics
Olympic bronze medallists for Great Britain
People from Broadstairs
Olympic medalists in field hockey
Alumni of Trinity Hall, Cambridge
Medalists at the 1952 Summer Olympics